Daniel Steven Farmer (born May 21, 1977) is a former American football wide receiver who played in the National Football League (NFL) and at UCLA. In 2000, he was drafted in the fourth round (103rd overall pick) by the Pittsburgh Steelers.

After being waived by the Steelers, Farmer played for 4 seasons for the Cincinnati Bengals. Plagued by minor injuries, Farmer went to play with the Miami Dolphins and Tampa Bay Buccaneers.  

Farmer holds the UCLA Bruins football record for career receiving yards with 3,020 (1996–1999).  He was also a standout volleyball player for the Bruins and won 2 National Championships.  He majored in history at UCLA.  In 2015, Danny joined his father George in the UCLA Athletic Hall of Fame. 

His father, George, also attended UCLA and was a member of the track, football, and basketball teams, including the Bruins' 1970 NCAA championship basketball team. George also played seven years in the NFL's Chicago Bears and Detroit Lions teams. Danny's grandfather Steve Miletich was a basketball player at USC and uncle Dave Farmer played football at USC and NFL.  His cousins David Farmer and Kevin Farmer played college football at Hawaii and Washington State respectively.  He is also related to Pat Miletich on his mother's side.  He has a fraternal twin brother, Tim, who excelled in volleyball at Loyola Marymount University and went on the play professionally in Europe. His sister Kelly is a prominent attorney in Los Angeles. 

He is a 1995 graduate of Loyola High School in Los Angeles. 

Farmer retired in 2006.

References

1977 births
Living people
American football wide receivers
Cincinnati Bengals players
UCLA Bruins football players
Players of American football from Los Angeles